Bhutan set up the program for the deaf in a hearing school in Thimpu ca. 2000, and the first dedicated school, in Paro, was approved in 2013.  Part of government funding for deaf education includes developing Bhutanese Sign Language as the language of instruction.  Development includes at least creating vocabulary for technical subjects, and deciding on which regional signs to use where they differ.  It is not clear if there are multiple sign languages in Bhutan, or merely local differences in vocabulary.  It is unknown whether Bhutanese Sign Language is related to the Indian or Nepali sign languages.

References

Languages of Bhutan
Sign languages